Dmitry Almazov (born 11 March 1982 in Moscow), mostly known by his stage name Bobina, is a Russian  trance DJ, record producer and radio host. He hosts a radio show called Russia Goes Clubbing. He has releases on the worlds top record labels such as Ministry of Sound, Perfecto, Armada, and Nebula. He has gained global popularity over the years and received support from top artists like Tiesto, Armin van Buuren, Paul Oakenfold, Ferry Corsten, and many others.

Accomplishments
• 2008 - The winner of Russian Dance Music Awards as "Best Russian DJ of 2007".

Discography

Albums
2004 "Catchy! (Black Hole Recordings)
2011 "Rocket Ride" (Maelstrom Records)
2013 "Same Difference" (Magik Muzik)
2016 "Speed Breaker" (Magik Muzik)
2019 "Targets" (Uniqode Lab)

Singles / extended plays
2013 "Play Fire With Fire" (with Susana)
2014 "Play Fire With Fire (Remixes)" (with Susana) 
2018 "Weightlessness" (Magik Muzik)
2018 "Mysterious Times" (with Christina Novelli) (Magik Muzik)
2019 "Lost & Found" (featuring Natalie Gioia) (Magik Muzik)
2019 "Saviour" (with Christina Novelli) (Magik Muzik)
2019 "Close Your Eyes" (Magik Muzik)
2019 "Autumn" (Magik Muzik)
2020 "Russia / China in the House" (with Atom Panda)
2020 "You Belong to Me 2.0" (with Betsie Larkin)
2020 "Warrior" (with Cari)
2020 "Ashes" (with Sid Sedgwick)
2020 "Through The Wall (with Natalie Gioia)
2020 "Lost" (featuring Natalie Gioia)
2020 "Rising Tide" (with Roxanne Emery)

References

External links
 
 
 

Living people
Russian trance musicians
Club DJs
Remixers
1982 births